Thennakumbura Amarakoon Rajapaksa Wasala Mohottige Priyantha Seneviratne (ප්‍රියන්ත සෙනවිරත්න; born 5 March), popularly as Priyantha Seneviratne, is an actor in Sri Lankan cinema, stage drama and television. Particularly act in comedy roles, Seneviratne is best known for the roles in television serials Uncle Sam, Pabalu, Podi Mama and Isuru Bhavana.

Personal life
He was born on 5 March in Thannekumbura, Kandy, Sri Lanka as the third child in the family. He has one elder sister, one elder brother and one younger sister. In his little age, he was suffered with terrible asthma, so the family transferred to Colombo.

He is married to Kanchana Kariyapperuma, a music teacher. He met Kanchana during the stage play Arundathi and then from Saranga Nawen Awith. The couple has one daughter, Pujani Manikya, who was born on 12 October 2005 and one son, Chirath Gagan, born on 28 September 2007.

Acting career
He entered drama career with the stage play Makulu Del staged in 1986 produced by Jagath Muthukumarana. At that time, he was a first year student at technical college, Werahera. Then he joined with Rupavahini Corporation for the children's program Kathandara Pituwa. He produced the program Balan Sabe Muthure telecast by Rupavahini. He also produced the stage play, Minisa.

Seneviratne started his film career with a major role in 2004 comedy film, Clean Out directed by Roy de Silva. Some of his popular cinema acting came through Sikuru Hathe, Ethumai Methumai and Super Six.

In 2007, he won the award for the Best Actor in a comedy role at Raigam Tele'es for the role "Sumanapala" in television serial Isuru Bhavana. In 2017, he won the Best Comedian award at Presidential Film Festival for the role in Paha Samath.

He hosts the program 4 Kendare with Mihira Sirithilaka as well as Hiru Super Dance with Shalani Tharaka and Kavinga Perera, both telecast on Hiru TV.

Notable theater works

 Comedy Buddy
 Makulu Del
 Minisa
 Rookada Rajje
 Saranga Nawen Awith

Notable television serials

 Akuru Maki Na
 Amarabandu Rupasinghe
 Bus Eke Iskole
 Dekada Kada
 Isuru Bhavana
 Kiyadenna Adare Tharam 
 Medi Sina
 Nil Mal Viyana 
 On Ataka Nataka
 Pabalu
 Pini
 Podi Mama
 Rantharu
 Shani Balawath
 Sihina Viman
 Somibara Jaramara
 Uncle Sam

Filmography

References

External links
 Chat With Priyantha Seneviratne

Sri Lankan male film actors
Sinhalese male actors
Living people
Year of birth missing (living people)